Jalalabad (also Romanized as Jalālābād; also known as Jalālābād-e Dowlatqarin) is a village in Vardasht Rural District, in the Central District of Semirom County, Isfahan Province, Iran. At the 2006 census, its population was 124, in 29 families.

References 

Populated places in Semirom County